("Ethiopia, Ethiopia, Ethiopia be first") was the national anthem of Ethiopia from 1975 to 1992, during the Derg military junta of Mengistu Haile Mariam. The anthem was first performed on Revolution Day on 12 September 1975. When the junta was reorganized in 1987 as the People's Democratic Republic of Ethiopia, the song was retained until 1992. The lyrics were written by poet Assefa Gebre-Mariam Tesema, and the music was composed by musician Daniel Yohannes Haggos.

Lyrics

See also 
 March Forward, Dear Mother Ethiopia, the current national anthem

Notes

References 

Historical national anthems
Ethiopian songs
National symbols of Ethiopia